Paroxysmal hemoglobinuria can refer to:
Paroxysmal nocturnal hemoglobinuria
Paroxysmal cold hemoglobinuria

See also
Hemoglobinuria